The Heinkel Wespe was a project study by the German company Heinkel for a tail-sitting, vertical take off and landing-interceptor aircraft. The aircraft did not have conventional wings, but instead featured a large rotor. Completed in 1945, it remained untested due to a lack of material at the end of the Second World War. A related project was the Heinkel Lerche.

Design

The aircraft was to be powered by a turboprop in the center of the airframe which was unusual for having a circular wing and would have had a small frontal area, making it a good platform for attacking bombers. It may have been designed for point defense, but due to the situation in Germany at the time, the engine was not completed and none were ever built.

Specifications

See related aircraft
Heinkel Lerche

Focke-Wulf Triebflugel

Lockheed XFV

Convair XFY Pogo

Notes

References

Wespe
Tailsitter aircraft
Ducted fan-powered aircraft
Single-engined tractor aircraft
Abandoned military aircraft projects of Germany